The scarlet flycatcher or austral vermilion flycatcher (Pyrocephalus rubinus) is a species of flycatcher, closely related to the vermilion flycatcher. It is found in southeastern Bolivia and Brazil, Paraguay to Argentina and Uruguay.  It is recognized as a species by some taxonomic authorities, including the International Ornithologists' Union.  Others still consider it to be a subspecies of the vermilion flycatcher.

Taxonomy
The scarlet flycatcher was described by the French polymath Georges-Louis Leclerc, Comte de Buffon in 1779 in his Histoire Naturelle des Oiseaux. The bird was also illustrated in a hand-coloured plate engraved by François-Nicolas Martinet in the Planches Enluminées D'Histoire Naturelle which was produced under the supervision of Edme-Louis Daubenton to accompany Buffon's text.  Neither the plate caption nor Buffon's description included a scientific name but in 1783 the Dutch naturalist Pieter Boddaert coined the binomial name Muscicapa rubinus in his catalogue of the Planches Enluminées. The type locality was restricted to Tefé on the Amazon River by the American ornithologist John T. Zimmer in 1941. The scarlet flycatcher is now placed in the genus Pyrocephalus that was introduced in 1839 by the English ornithologist and bird artist John Gould. The species is monotypic. The generic name combines the Ancient Greek purrhos meaning "flame-coloured" or "red" and -kephalos meaning "-headed". The specific epithet rubinus is Medieval Latin for "ruby-coloured".

The scarlet flycatcher was formerly considered to be conspecific with the vermilion flycatcher (Pyrocephalus obscurus). The species were split based on a molecular phylogenetic study published in 2016.

Description 
The scarlet flycatcher appears very similar to the vermilion flycatcher, but can be distinguished by its pointier wings. Their songs are also quite distinctive. Their range and breeding times do not generally overlap with the vermilion flycatcher.

References

scarlet flycatcher
scarlet flycatcher
scarlet flycatcher